Speed climbing competitions at the 2019 IFSC Climbing World Cup were held at six locations, from 12 April to 20 October 2019. The top three in each competition received medals, and at the end of the season, the overall winners were awarded trophies. The overall winners were determined based upon points, which athletes were awarded for finishing in the top 30 of each individual event. Bassa Mawem won the men's seasonal title, YiLing Song won the women's seasonal title, and Russian Federation defended its national team title.

Winners overview

Records broken

Overall ranking 
The overall ranking is determined based upon points, which athletes are awarded for finishing in the top 30 of each individual event. There are six competitions in the season, but only the best five attempts are counted. The national ranking is the sum of the points of that country's three best male and female athletes. Results displayed in parentheses are not counted.

Men 
The results of the ten most successful athletes of the Speed World Cup 2019:

Women 
The results of the ten most successful athletes of the Speed World Cup 2019:

National Teams 
The results of the ten most successful countries of the Lead World Cup 2019:

Country names as used by the IFSC

Moscow, Russia (April, 12–14)

Men 
91 men attended the event.

France's Bassa Mawem took the win. Russia's Vladislav Deulin placed second while Indonesia's Aspar Jaelolo placed third. World record holder, Iran's Reza Alipourshenazandifar placed 7th.

Women 
76 women attended the event.

China's YiLing Song won her first gold medal in the World Cup circuit after a tight race in the final against France's Anouck Jaubert who took second place. Russia's Iuliia Kaplina took third place.

Chongqing, China (April, 26–28)

Men 
85 men attended the event.

Indonesia's Alfian Muhammad took the win. Ukraine's Kostiantyn Pavlenko placed second and Russia's Sergey Rukin third. France's Bassa Mawem, Moscow's winner, was eliminated early in the competition, placing 15th.

Women 
74 women attended the event.

China's YiLing Song won her second gold medal. Song also set a new world record (7.101 seconds) in the quarter-final race against Poland’s Natalia Kalucka. Poland's Aleksandra Miroslaw took silver and Russia's Iuliia Kaplina took bronze.

Wujiang, China (May, 3–5)

Men 
85 men attended the event.

Russia's Dmitrii Timofeev beat France's Bassa Mawem in the final race and claimed the gold medal. Mawem took second place while Italy's Ludovico Fossali took third place.

Women 
68 women attended the event.

Poland's Aleksandra Miroslaw won the gold medal after a tight final race against Indonesia's Aries Susanti Rahayu. Rahayu placed second while France's Anouck Jaubert placed third. China's YiLing Song, who had just set a new world record last week in Chongqing, slipped in an early race against Poland’s Aleksandra Kalucka and finished the competition in 16th place.

Villars, Switzerland (July, 4–6)

Men 
84 men attended the event.

Russia's Aleksandr Shikov and Dmitrii Timofeev placed first and second respectively. The Czech Republic’s Jan Kriz beat France's Bassa Mawem in the small final and earned a bronze medal.

Women 
73 women attended the event.

France's Anouck Jaubert took the gold medal after winning a final race against China's YiLing Song. Song earned a silver medal while Russia's Elizaveta Ivanova earned bronze after beating China's Di Niu in the small final.

Chamonix, France (July, 11–13)

Men 
97 men attended the event.

Indonesia's Alfian Muhammad took the win. China's QiXin Zhong placed second while Russia's Vladislav Deulin placed third.

Women 
83 women attended the event.

China's YiLing Song earned a gold medal. Russia's Elizaveta Ivanova placed second while Poland's Aleksandra Kalucka placed third.

Xiamen, China (October, 18–20)

Men 
65 men attended the event.

China's QiXin Zhong won the gold medal. Russia's Lev Rudatskiy and Vladislav Deulin placed second and third respectively.

Women 
51 women attended the event.

Indonesia's Aries Susanti Rahayu set a new world record (6.995 seconds) in the final race against China's YiLing Song and claimed the gold medal. Rahayu also became the first woman in the history to break the 7-second barrier. Song claimed the silver while Russia's Mariia Krasavina claimed the bronze.

References 

IFSC Climbing World Cup
2019 in sport climbing